Michael or Mike Lang may refer to:

Michael Lang (producer) (1944–2022), American music producer
Michael Lang (footballer, born 1991), Swiss football midfielder
Michael Lang (footballer, born 1998), Austrian football defender
Michael Lang (musician) (born 1941), American pianist and composer
Michael Lang (gymnast) (1875–1962), American Olympic gymnast
Michael J. Lang, Canadian private equity investor
Mike Lang (film executive), former CEO of Miramax Films
Mike Lang (Texas politician) (born 1962), Republican member of the Texas House of Representatives
Mike Lang (Montana politician), Republican member of the Montana House of Representatives

See also
Michael Lange (born 1950), American director and producer
Mike Lange (born 1948), radio broadcaster